Camera Camera is the tenth studio album by the English progressive rock band Renaissance, released in 1981.

After losing two of their five members and being dropped from their label, Renaissance signed on to Miles Copeland's I.R.S. Records. The departed members were replaced by keyboardist/singer Peter Gosling and drummer Peter Barron (neither of whom is included in the album's band photos). Between the previous Renaissance album and Camera Camera, Annie Haslam and Michael Dunford had worked with Gosling as a trio called Nevada, releasing two singles and recording several demos. Nevada's somewhat new wave sound strongly influenced Camera Camera. One of the Camera Camera songs, "Faeries", had previously been recorded (but not released) by Nevada.

The original 1981 UK release of Camera Camera did not include the single "Bonjour Swansong"; but the song has been included on all releases of the album since 1982.

This was the last Renaissance studio album to include lyrics by the band's longtime lyricist Betty Thatcher. She wrote the words to "Bonjour Swansong" as "a private goodbye to the group."

Track listing

Personnel
Renaissance
Annie Haslam - lead and backing vocals
Michael Dunford - guitars, backing vocals
Peter Gosling - keyboards, backing vocals
Jon Camp - bass, backing vocals, guitars
Peter Barron - drums, backing vocals, percussion

Production
John Acock - engineer

References

1981 albums
Renaissance (band) albums
I.R.S. Records albums
Illegal Records albums
RCA Records albums
Repertoire Records albums